The Miami Mile Stakes was an American Thoroughbred horse race once run annually during the last week of April at Calder Race Course in Miami Gardens, Florida. Open to horses age three and older, it was contested on turf over a distance of 1 mile (8 furlongs). The last running was in 2017.

Inaugurated as the Miami Breeders' Cup Handicap in 1987, it has been raced at various distances:
 About  miles: 1987–1989, 1992–1993
  miles : 1990–1991, 1994–1996 
 1 mile : 1997–present

The race was run on dirt in 1990 and 1991. In 2003, the race also had to be shifted from the turf to the dirt due to weather considerations but maintained its Grade III status.

In 2015, this race began to run at Gulfstream Park.

Records
Speed  record: (at current distance of 1 mile)
 1:33.01 – Smokem Kitten (2016)

Most wins:
 2 – Simply Majestic (1988, 1989)
 2 – Band Is Passing (2000, 2002)

Most wins by an owner:
 2 – Ted Sabarese (1988, 1989)
 2 – Stanley M. Ersoff (2000, 2002)

Most wins by a jockey:

 3 – Manoel Cruz (2005, 2008, 2010)
 2 – Jerry Bailey (1988, 1992)
 2 – José Ferrer (1996, 1997)
 2 – Eduardo Nunez (1998, 2007)
 2 – Javier Castellano (1999, 2009)

Most wins by a trainer:
 3 – Martin D. Wolfson (1992, 1994, 1999)

Winners

References
 The 2008 Miami Mile Handicap at the NTRA

Discontinued horse races
1987 establishments in Florida
Recurring sporting events disestablished in 2018